Ramsgate Lifeboat Station is a Royal National Lifeboat Institution (RNLI) station located in the Port of Ramsgate in the English county of Kent.  The station is one of the oldest to operate in the British Isles and has launched to many notable services. Among the awards won by its crews over the years are 42 RNLI medals, including 2 gold, 39 silver and 1 bronze, the last being awarded in 2000.

History
A lifeboat station was first established at Ramsgate Harbour in 1802 by the trustees of the harbour, pre dating the formation of any national lifeboat organisation by more than 20 years. After a lapse in service between 1824 and 1851 a station was re-established by the trustees.

In 1865, the lifeboat station was taken over by the Board of Trade and the RNLI, who ran it jointly until 1922, when the RNLI it took over full responsibility, and who run the service to this day. The current lifeboat station, on the harbour wall between the inner and outer pools of the main harbour opened in 1998 and services both an onshore lifeboat, the 'Bob Turnbull' and offshore lifeboat, the 'RNLB Esme Anderson'.

Dunkirk evacuation
During the evacuation of troops from Dunkirk in 1940, Lifeboat Prudential, of Ramsgate was the first little ship to the rescue. The lifeboat left Ramsgate at 2.20 in the afternoon with Coxswain Howard Primrose Knight in command with her own crew of eight men. They had been issued with gas masks, steel helmets and the lifeboat was loaded with four coils of grass warp and cans of fresh water for the troops. She took in tow eight boats, most of them wherries, manned by eighteen naval men, and when she reached Dunkirk her role was to tow the wherries between the beaches and the waiting ships. In total she rescued 2,800 troops from the beaches. For his 'gallantry and determination,' Coxswain Howard Knight was awarded the Distinguished Service Medal.

Fleet

All Weather Boats

All Weather Boat Gallery

Inshore Lifeboats

See also

 Royal National Lifeboat Institution

References

History of Kent
Lifeboat stations in Kent
Ramsgate